James Benton Grant (January 2, 1848 – November 1, 1911) was an American mining engineer, Confederate soldier, and the third Governor of Colorado from 1883 to 1885. He was born in Russell County, Alabama and died in Excelsior Springs, Missouri.

During the outbreak of the American Civil War, he enlisted as a private in the 20th Alabama Light Artillery regiment in the Confederate Army. He attended what is now Iowa State University for two years and then Cornell University from 1873–1874 before he moved to the Freiberg School of Mines in Germany, where he studied metallurgy. He was also the first Democratic governor of Colorado.

See also
Grant–Humphreys Mansion
Politics of the United States
Politics of Colorado

References

1848 births
1911 deaths
Cornell University alumni
Democratic Party governors of Colorado
American mining engineers
People from Russell County, Alabama
Iowa State University alumni
19th-century American politicians
Confederate States Army personnel